Columbia Cosmopolitan Recreation Area, commonly referred to as Cosmo Park, is a city park in Columbia, Missouri. At , it is the largest park in Columbia. It is also the location of the annual Show-Me State Games.

History

The park is built on the location of the former Columbia Municipal Airport. The runways were rebuilt as parking lots, and the old layout of the airport can be seen in aerial imagery.

On September 17, 2007, the park was proposed as a possible location for Columbia's third high school. On October 10, 2007 City Council rejected this proposal.

Activities in the park

Sports

L.A. Nickell Golf Course

The park features a par 70, 18-hole golf course that is open year-round (weather permitting).   The course has no formal dress code; golf carts, a driving range, and lessons are all available.

Columbia Skate Park

The park contains a  skate park that was opened in 1999. The skate park was built with the help of skateboarders and inline skaters.

Additional sports facilities available:

 Antimi Sports Complex - eight baseball/softball/tee-ball fields.
 Football fields - six
 Horseshoe pits - twelve
 Remote control car track
 Roller hockey rink
 Soccer fields - nineteen
 Tennis courts - eight
 Volleyball courts - six sand, one grass

Trails

Several trails wind through the park:
 
 Cosmo Nature Trail - (1.75 miles, dirt).  This trail wanders through a heavily wooded nature area and wetlands.
 Bear Creek Trail - (4.8 miles, limestone gravel).  This trail runs along Bear Creek and connects the park to the  Albert Oakland Park.
 Cosmo Fitness Trail - (1.25 Miles, asphalt).  A hard surface trail open to walkers, bikers, and skaters (no motorized vehicles).
 Rhett's Run Mountain Bike Trail - (2.4 miles, dirt).  A mountain bike course.

Playground 

The park features a sizable playground, which was renovated in the last few years.

References

External links 
 Columbia Cosmopolitan Recreation Area official site

Parks in Missouri
Parks in Columbia, Missouri
Protected areas of Boone County, Missouri
Tourist attractions in Columbia, Missouri
Sports in Columbia, Missouri